Ivan Andreadis (3 April 1924 in Prague - 27 October 1992 in Prague) was a Czechoslovak international table tennis player.

Table tennis career
He won several medals in singles, doubles, and team events in the World Table Tennis Championships from 1947 to 1957.

His 27 World Championship medals included nine gold medals; four in the team event, four in the  doubles with František Tokár, Bohumil Váňa and Ladislav Štípek respectively and one in the mixed doubles with Gizi Farkas.

He also won three English Open titles.

He was of Greek-Jewish origin.

Hall of Fame
He was inducted into the Hall of Fame of the International Table Tennis Federation in 1995.

He worked as a railway planning official in the ČKD Sokolovo works in Prague.

See also
 List of table tennis players
 List of World Table Tennis Championships medalists

References

Czech male table tennis players
Czechoslovak table tennis players
Czechoslovak people of Greek descent
1924 births
1992 deaths
Jewish table tennis players
Sportspeople from Prague